The South Australian Railways K class (narrow gauge) comprised a single locomotive. The design, by South Australian Railways Locomotive Engineer William Thow, was very similar to that of the broad-gauge K class, but it was smaller and lighter. It was allocated number 52 within the sequence allocated to the larger locomotives. 

The locomotive was built in 1883, five years after the first broad-gauge K class locomotive and a year before the last of the 18 such locomotives entered service. No. 52 was built by Dübs and Company of Glasgow, whereas Beyer, Peacock and Company, of Manchester, built all the broad-gauge class.

The broad-gauge design was moderately "shrunk" to meet the smaller loading gauge of  lines and the lower load-bearing capacity of track compared with the  broad gauge. Some key specifications are compared in the table below. 

A major design weakness of the broad-gauge K class was the lack of a leading bogie (pilot truck), which led to frequent derailments, especially on sharp curves and difficult gradients. A partial solution was to run the locomotives in reverse – i.e., with cab leading – so that the rear bogie led, providing guidance for the driving wheels. The extent to which the weakness affected no. 52 is not known, although the presence of a stopcock on both ends of the locomotive – to take water from a four-wheeled tank wagon on longer journeys – indicates that it was able to be operated both funnel-first and cab-first.

Little is known about the service life of the locomotive; it is believed to have spent most of its half-century existence at Peterborough as a shunting engine.

References

Narrow gauge steam locomotives
K
Dübs locomotives
0-6-4T locomotives
Railway locomotives introduced in 1884